Warren is an unincorporated community in Marion County, in the U.S. state of Missouri.

History
Warren was platted in 1854, and named for its location within Warren Township. A post office called Warren was established in 1839, and remained in operation until 1953.

References

Unincorporated communities in Marion County, Missouri
Unincorporated communities in Missouri